The Waterway trail on the Moosalbe is one of seven themed walks on the subject of hydrology in the German state of Rhineland-Palatinate. The path runs for over 33 km along the Moosalbe and Hirschalbe streams through the Palatine Forest and has 23 way stations.

Documentation by the State Ministry for the Environment and Forests describes the route and gives detailed information on the geology, hydrology und climate of the area.

Route 
The following significant water management stations connected with mills, weirs, wells, springs, waterbodies and ecosystems lie on the route:
 Klug'sche Mühle, a mill with weir and mill pond
 Fischweiher source (source of the Karlstal)
 Fish breeding ponds
 Unterhammer, with a weir for driving the iron hammer mill
 Hummocky meadow (Buckelwiesen), an irrigation scheme
 Weir (Stauwehr)
 Iron smelting (Eisenschmelz)
 Stelzenberg Waterworks and spring
 Friends of Nature house of Finsterbrunnertal
 Rolling mill (Walzwerk)
 Borehole (Tiefbrunnen) III
 Engtalbach waterway management (Gewässerausbau) near Krickenbach
 Old Pumphouse (Altes Pumpwerk) in the parish of Schopp
 Natural section of the Moosalbe near Schopp
 Powder mill pond (Pulvermühlweiher)
 Powder mill (Pulvermühle), ruins of the old factory that produced black powder
 Hirschalb valley and mill (Hirschalbtal and Hirschalbmühle)
 Source of the Moosalbe
 Tiefenteich spring
 Submerged spring (Grundquelle), near Tiefenteich
 Langspateliges Laichkraut
 Oberhammer Waterworks with Boreholes 1 and 2 (near Trippstadt)
 Karlstal Gorge with its cave house and the Amseldell

See also 
 Walking routes in the Palatine Forest

References 

Water resources management
Hiking trails in Rhineland-Palatinate
Buildings and structures in Rhineland-Palatinate
Culture of the Palatinate (region)
Palatinate Forest
Western Palatinate